Metarctia benitensis is a moth of the subfamily Arctiinae. It was described by William Jacob Holland in 1893. It is found in Cameroon, the Democratic Republic of the Congo, Equatorial Guinea, Kenya, Lesotho, South Africa, Sudan and Uganda.

References

 

Metarctia
Moths described in 1893